Lake Tritonis was a large body of fresh water in northern Africa that was described in many ancient texts. Classical-era Greek writers placed the lake in what today is southeastern Algeria and southern Tunisia (modern Chott el-Djerid). In details of the late myths and personal observations related by these historians, the lake was said to be named after Triton. According to Herodotus it contained two islands, Phla, which the Lacedaemonians were to have colonized, according to an oracle, and Mene.

Location
The location is unclear. The lake is mentioned as being in Libya, a land the ancient Greeks believed encircled their world, "washed on all sides by the sea," Herodotus said, "except where it is attached to Asia." "In their knowledge, Libya extended from Ancient Egypt, the Nile Valley and its basin, Algeria and along the south of Ancient Egypt."

Both Herodotus in the fifth century B.C. and Diodorus in the first century A.D. described the lake. In the Periplus of Pseudo-Scylax, which is thought to date from the mid-4th century BC, it is said to have a circumference of 1000 stades, giving it an area of about 2,300 km² (900 mi²), or, half the size of the contemporary United States state of Rhode Island. Herodotus assumed that there would have to be a large river flowing into it, which he called the Triton.

History

The name of the lake appears in discussion of the geography related in Greek mythology.

When Athena is addressed as Athene Tritogeneia ("born of Trito"), the archaic epithet is explained by the episode where, having sprung fully formed from the head—or thigh—of Zeus—who had swallowed her pregnant mother to prevent his own downfall from the rule over the current Greek pantheon by her progeny, as predicted—the goddess was escorted to Lake Trito and attended to by the nymphs. A different interpretation, taking into consideration much earlier Greek and Minoan myths, leads translator Robert Graves to suggest that the reverse direction of religious influence occurred, with Neith being the deity who influenced development of the Greek concept for the goddess Athene. Neith was an ancient deity when first appearing in the earliest Egyptian pantheon, and is suspected to have originated among the Berbers. 

The story of the Argonauts places Triton's home on the Mediterranean coast of Libya.  Before the epic Argonautika of Apollonius, Herodotus knew this tradition of Jason, in which winds
"carried him out of his course to the coast of Libya; where, before he discovered the land, he got among the shallows of Lake Tritonis. As he was turning it in his mind how he should find his way out, Triton (they say) appeared to him, and offered to show him the channel, and secure him a safe retreat, if he would give him the tripod. Jason complying, was shown by Triton the passage through the shallows; after which the god took the tripod, and, carrying it to his own temple, seated himself upon it, and, filled with prophetic fury, delivered to Jason and his companions a long prediction. "When a descendant," he said, "of one of the Argo's crew should seize and carry off the brazen tripod, then by inevitable fate would a hundred Grecian cities be built around Lake Tritonis." The Libyans of that region, when they heard the words of this prophecy, took away the tripod and hid it. " 

As Apollonius of Rhodes narrates it, when the Argo was driven ashore on the Lesser Syrtes by a fierce storm while returning from Colchis, the Argonauts found themselves in "an area surrounded by sands". They portaged their ship twelve days to Lake Tritonis, but the lake water was salty and undrinkable. Since they could find no outlet from Lake Tritonis to the sea, they could do nothing. Then they propitiated the deities with a golden tripod on the shore and Triton, the local deity, appeared to them in the form of a youth, to show them a hidden channel to the sea.

This late myth related that a lake nymph named Tritonis made the lake her home and, according to an ancient tradition, was the mother of Athena by Poseidon. (Herodotus, iv. 180; Pindar. Pytli. iv. 20.) By Amphithemis, she became the mother of Nasamon and Caphaurus.

Catastrophic natural disaster

At an unknown date, an earthquake collapsed dikes or the land structures that kept the lake from drying up, causing drainage to the sea of most of the fresh water and at the most allowing for a seasonal lake or marsh. It then possibly became associated with Chott el-Djerid, a seasonal lake which is marshy and shallow, now separated by a 50 meter high elevated ridge ten kilometers wide from the Mediterranean. Other suggested locations are various Sabkha along the Gulf of Sidra and due west coastal sections, which became filled in due to salt and gypsum evaporates as well as sand washed or blown in. These areas are below sea level for large expanses, typically only less than 5 meters in depth.

This article is based partly on the entry in the Dictionary of Greek and Roman Geography, by William Smith, LLD, 1854.

Notes

Sources
A support for the existence of paleolakes and paleorivers buried under Saharan sand by means of Bgravitational signal from EIGEN 6C4
Dictionary of Greek and Roman Biography and Mythology, p. 1175
Mapping argo
Cyrene
Libya
Amazon.com: Phrase: "Lake Tritonis"
Southern Tunisia - research campaign 2005
CHOTT EL JERID: Dry salt lake 
Liddell-Scott-Jones Lexicon of Classical Greek
Geology of Wessex Coast
Chapter 28 
Chapter 27 

Tritonis, Lake
Tritonis, Lake
Locations in Greek mythology
Triton (mythology)